The Santa Maria Times is a daily American newspaper on California's Central Coast serving the cities of Santa Maria; Orcutt; Guadalupe; Nipomo; unincorporated parts of northern Santa Barbara County and southern San Luis Obispo County.  It is published Tuesday through Saturday, and is part of Santa Maria California News Media Inc., which also publishes the Lompoc Record and Santa Ynez Valley News, among other newspapers.

History

The Santa Maria Times was established in April 1882.  In 1918, the paper became a daily.

Owner E.L. Petersen sold the paper in 1938 to Robert and Stanworth Hancock, who in turn sold the paper to Kansas-based Stauffer Communications in 1948.  In 1947 the paper bought up the Santa Maria Vidette, Guadalupe Gazette, and Santa Maria Courier, and later the Santa Maria Advertiser Burl Hagagone bought the paper in 1958. The paper had been owned by Pulitzer, Inc. at the time of the company's acquisition by Lee Enterprises in 2005.

In 2016, the Santa Maria Times won first place in the General Excellence category in its division of California's Better Newspapers Contest. In 2018, the Santa Maria Times received First Place CNPA Online General Excellence and received a 2018 Lee President's Award for its yearlong series "Green Rush in the 805?", and in 2019 received a President's Award honorable mention by parent company Lee Enterprises for the newspaper’s in-depth series "Wildfire County: Planning for the next big blaze". 

In November 2019, Davis Taylor became Regional Publisher  Marga K. Cooley has been the Managing Editor since 2013.  In March 2020, the paper was sold to Santa Maria California News Media Inc. a newly formed company led by a group of Canadian newspaper executives. Terri Leifeste became Vice President/Group Publisher.

References

External links
 

1882 establishments in California
Daily newspapers published in California